Paula Margaret Nickolds (born February 1973) is a British businesswoman. From January 2017 until January 2020, she was the managing director of the John Lewis department store chain.

Early life
Nickolds was born in February 1973. Her father, Clive Nickolds, was a senior director at Marks & Spencer, and head of its international operations. She earned a bachelor's degree in history from the University of Southampton, and attended St Helen's School where she spent hours in the pool as a keen member of the swimming team.

Career
In 1994, Nickolds joined John Lewis as a graduate trainee at their Oxford Street flagship store. In January 2017, she succeeded Andy Street as managing director of John Lewis; she thereby became the first woman to hold this position in the company's 153-year history.

She unexpectedly left the company in January 2020, along with two of John Lewis' most senior, long serving executives, just as it looked to navigate a radical overhaul to merge its grocery and department store businesses.

In May 2021, it was announced that she has been appointed by Sainsbury's to run its £7.8bn clothing and general merchandise arm, putting her head-to-head with her former employer John Lewis.

References

1973 births
Living people
British businesspeople
British women in business